The 2019 Alabama Crimson Tide football team represented the University of Alabama in the 2019 NCAA Division I FBS football season. This was the Crimson Tide's 125th overall season, 86th as a member of the Southeastern Conference (SEC), and 28th within the SEC's Western Division. They played their home games at Bryant–Denny Stadium in Tuscaloosa, Alabama, and were led by 13th-year head coach Nick Saban.

The defending national runners-up, Alabama began the season ranked second in the AP Poll, and were the favorites to repeat as SEC Champions. The Crimson Tide won their first seven games of the year handily, and rose to first in the AP Poll. They were ranked third in the season's first College Football Playoff rankings heading into an anticipated match-up against second-ranked LSU, which Alabama lost 46–41. The next week, Alabama lost starting quarterback Tua Tagovailoa to a season-ending hip injury in the game against Mississippi State. They finished the regular season with a 48–45 upset loss to cross-state rival Auburn.

With a regular season record of 10–2, Alabama was not selected for the College Football Playoff for the first time since the inception of the format in 2014. The Crimson Tide were also not invited to a New Year's Six bowl game, making this the first season since 2010 that Alabama was not selected to a NY6 or BCS bowl. They were instead invited to the Citrus Bowl, where they defeated Michigan.

Tagovailoa, at the time of his injury, was considered a candidate for the Heisman Trophy and was on pace to break his own NCAA FBS passer rating record. He was replaced by backup Mac Jones for the remainder of the season. Running back Najee Harris led the team with 1,224 rushing yards and 20 total touchdowns, tied for the SEC lead. Receivers Jerry Jeudy and DeVonta Smith were both named All-SEC. On defense, the team was led by first-team all-conference players linebacker Anfernee Jennings and safety Xavier McKinney. Nine Alabama players were selected in the 2020 NFL Draft, including No. 5 overall selection Tua Tagovailoa.

Previous season
In 2018, Alabama went undefeated in the regular season and won the 2018 SEC Championship Game over Georgia. The Crimson Tide entered the College Football Playoff as the number one seed, winning the semi-final played at the Orange Bowl over Oklahoma before falling to Clemson in the 2019 College Football Playoff National Championship.

Offseason

Position key

Offseason departures
Seven Alabama players with remaining eligibility declared early for the 2019 NFL Draft. In addition, 14 seniors from the 2018 team graduated.

Recruiting
Alabama's 2019 recruiting class consisted of 27 recruits, 15 of which enrolled early. Alabama had the highest ranked class in the nation according to 247Sports.com and ESPN, and had the second best class behind Georgia according to Rivals.com. The class was ranked No. 1 by the 247Sports Composite, which aggregates the ratings of the major recruiting services. Headlining the class were consensus top-10 recruits Antonio Alfano (defensive end), Trey Sanders (running back), and Evan Neal (offensive tackle).

Transfers

Outgoing

Incoming

Returning starters

Offense

Defense

Special teams

Spring game
The 2019 Crimson Tide held spring practices in March and April. The 2019 Alabama football spring game, "A-Day" took place in Tuscaloosa, AL on April 13, 2019, at 1 p.m. CST with the White team beating the Crimson team 31–17. Freshman WR John Metchie III was named A-Day MVP after hauling in five catches for a game-high 133 receiving yards. White team QB Mac Jones led all passers, completing 19 of 23 passes for 271 yards.

Preseason

Award watch lists 
Listed in the order that they were released

SEC media days
The 2019 SEC Media Days were held July 15–18 in Birmingham, Alabama. In the preseason media poll, Alabama was voted the overwhelming favorite to repeat as West Division Champion and SEC Champion.

Preseason All-SEC teams
The Crimson Tide had 13 players at 14 positions selected to the preseason all-SEC teams.

Offense

1st team

Tua Tagovailoa – QB

Najee Harris – RB

Jerry Jeudy – WR

Alex Leatherwood – OL

Jedrick Wills – OL

2nd team

Jaylen Waddle – WR

3rd team

Miller Forristall – TE

Matt Womack – OL

Defense

1st team

Raekwon Davis – DL

Anfernee Jennings – LB

Dylan Moses – LB

Trevon Diggs – DB

2nd team

Patrick Surtain II – DB

Xavier McKinney – DB

3rd team

LaBryan Ray  – DL

Terrell Lewis – LB

Shyheim Carter – DB

Specialists

1st team

Jaylen Waddle – all purpose player

Jaylen Waddle – RET

Schedule
Alabama announced its 2019 football schedule on September 18, 2018. The 2019 Crimson Tide' schedule consists of 7 home games, 4 away games, and 1 neutral site game for the regular season. Alabama will host four SEC conference opponents Ole Miss (rivalry), Arkansas, Tennessee (Third Saturday of October) and LSU (rivalry) and will travel for four SEC opponents to South Carolina, Texas A&M, Mississippi State (rivalry) and arch-rival Auburn for the 84th Iron Bowl to close out the SEC regular season on the road. Alabama is not scheduled to play SEC East opponents Florida, Georgia, Kentucky, Missouri and Vanderbilt in the 2019 regular season. The Crimson Tide’s bye week comes during week 6 (on October 5) and week 10 (on November 2).

Alabama's out of conference opponents represent the ACC, C-USA, Independents and Southern. The Crimson Tide will host three non–conference games which are against New Mexico State of the FBS independents, Southern Miss of the Conference USA and Western Carolina of the SoCon to close out the regular season and travel to Atlanta, GA for Chick-fil-A Kickoff to host Duke from the ACC.

Schedule Source:

Coaching staff

Graduate assistants
Vinnie Sunseri
Tino Sunseri

 Andy Kwon

Analysts
Isaac Shewmaker
Joe Houston
Johnathan Galante
A. J. Milwee
Alex Mortensen
Major Applewhite
Mike Stoops
Javier Arenas
Nick Perry
Dean Altobelli
Gordon Steele
Butch Jones
Rob Ezell
Patrick Reilly

Roster

Depth chart
Projected Depth Chart 2019:

True Freshman
Double Position : *

Game summaries

vs Duke Blue Devils 

Sources:

Statistics

New Mexico State Aggies 

Sources:

Statistics

at South Carolina Gamecocks 

Sources:

Statistics

Southern Miss Golden Eagles 

Sources:

Statistics

Ole Miss Rebels 

Sources:

Statistics

at No. 24 Texas A&M Aggies 

Sources:

Statistics

Tennessee Volunteers 

Sources:

Statistics

Arkansas Razorbacks 

Sources:

Statistics

No. 2 LSU Tigers 

Sources:

Statistics

at Mississippi State Bulldogs 

Sources:

Statistics

Western Carolina Catamounts 

Sources:

Statistics

at No. 15 Auburn Tigers 

Sources:

Statistics

vs No. 14 Michigan Wolverines 

Sources:

Statistics

Rankings

Statistics

Team

Offense

Defense

Key: POS: Position, SOLO: Solo Tackles, AST: Assisted Tackles, TOT: Total Tackles, TFL: Tackles-for-loss, SACK: Quarterback Sacks, INT: Interceptions, PD: Passes Defended, FF: Forced Fumbles, FR: Fumbles Recovered, BLK: Kicks or Punts Blocked, SAF: Safeties

Special teams

Scoring

Scores by quarter (non-conference opponents)

Scores by quarter (SEC opponents)

Scores by quarter (All opponents)

Awards and honors

Postseason

Bowl game 

Alabama was selected to face Michigan in the 2020 Citrus Bowl on New Year's Day. The last time Alabama faced Michigan was during the regular season in 2012 when the Tide beat Michigan 41-14. Alabama defeated Michigan 35-16 in the 2020 VRBO Citrus Bowl on January 1, 2020 to close out the season at 11-2 overall. For nine straight seasons, the Crimson Tide has won 11 or more games.

2020 NFL draft

The 2020 NFL Draft was held virtually on April 23–25, 2020.

Crimson Tide who were picked in the 2020 NFL Draft:

Media affiliates

Radio
 WTID (FM) (Tide 102.9) – Nationwide (Dish Network, Sirius XM, TuneIn radio and iHeartRadio)

TV
CBS Family - CBS 42 (CBS), CBS Sports Network 
ESPN/ABC Family - ABC 33/40 (ABC), ABC, ESPN, ESPN2, ESPNU, ESPN+, SEC Network)
FOX Family - WBRC (FOX), FOX/FS1, FSN

References

Alabama
Alabama Crimson Tide football seasons
Citrus Bowl champion seasons
Alabama Crimson Tide football